Simone Ashley Manuel (born August 2, 1996) is an American professional swimmer specializing in freestyle events. At the 2016 Rio Olympics, she won two gold and two silver medals: gold in the 100-meter freestyle and the 4x100-meter medley, and silver in the 50-meter freestyle and the 4×100-meter freestyle relay. In winning the 100-meter freestyle, a tie with Penny Oleksiak of Canada, Manuel became the first Black American woman to win an individual Olympic gold in swimming and set an Olympic record and an American record. At the 2020 Tokyo Olympics, she won a bronze medal as the anchor of the American 4×100-meter freestyle relay team.

Manuel also holds three world records as a member of a relay team, and she is a six-time individual NCAA Division I Women's Swimming and Diving Championships champion, becoming one of the first three African American women to place in the top three spots in the 100-yard freestyle event in any Division I NCAA Swimming Championship. From 2014 to 2018, she attended Stanford University, where she swam for the Stanford Cardinal and helped Stanford win the NCAA team championship in women's swimming and diving in 2017 and 2018. She turned pro in July 2018.

After entering Stanford in 2014, she became a member of the Stanford Cardinal women's swimming team. She broke the school records in the 50-, 100-, and 200-yard freestyle in the same year, and in 2014, her freshman year, she also broke the American and National Collegiate Athletic Association (NCAA) records for 100-yard freestyle. Manuel is a six-time individual NCAA champion: winning the 50- and 100-yard freestyle in 2015, 2017, and 2018. She redshirted in 2016. As a senior, she won the Honda Sports Award as the nation's best female swimmer as well as the Honda Cup for the best overall female collegiate athlete.

Activism and outreach

Efforts to increase access, diversity, and inclusion in swimming

Make A Splash Foundation 
Manuel has partnered with multiple organizations and projects whose goal is to extend opportunities and promote inclusion in swimming. She is an ambassador for the Make A Splash organization headed by the USA Swimming Foundation. This program partners with local communities to bring awareness to the need for aquatics education in underserved areas by issuing grants to local swim lesson providers. The program teaches the life-saving skills of swimming and pool safety to young children from under-resourced communities often free of charge.

Inclusion rider 
Manuel signed a sponsorship with the popular swimwear company TYR Sport, Inc. in 2018 and entered the world of professional swimming. In signing her sponsorship with TYR Sport, Inc., Manuel instituted an inclusion rider in her contract. The addition, often seen in the entertainment industry to require groups to reach a specific level of diversity, was a first ever agreement of its kind in professional sports. In TYR Sport, Inc.'s press release regarding the signing of Manuel, the company describes that the inclusion rider "ensures that [Simone's] partners [or TYR] extend meaningful opportunities to traditionally underrepresented groups and that diversity be reflected in the creative efforts [Simone] pursues with the brand".

Promise School 
In 2019 Manuel partnered with Lebron James’ Promise School in Akron, Ohio. With this partnership, she helped form a 4-week summer swim program for students of the school. The program was hosted by the Akron YMCA that provided the swim instructors and assisted in funding the program. Out of 140 attendees, 90% had no experience in the pool. Although Manuel could not be physically present at the camp because she was training for the Olympics, she did visit the school earlier that year in March to introduce the summer program and have a meet and greet with the kids. For the duration of the camp, Manuel sent videos giving tips and encouragement to the students. In agreement with her inclusion rider, her sponsor TYR provided the children with swimsuits and other swim gear necessary for the camp.

Swimming career

2012
Manuel swam at the 2012 United States Olympic Trials, placing 20th in the 50-meter freestyle and 17th in the 100-meter freestyle events. The following month, as a 16-year-old at the 2012 Junior Pan Pacific Swimming Championships, held at the Veterans Memorial Aquatic Center in Honolulu, she won gold medals in the 100-meter freestyle with a time of 54.80 seconds, the 4×100-meter freestyle relay where she set a Championships record of 54.60 on the first leg of the relay, the 4×200-meter freestyle relay, the 4×100-meter medley relay, placed fourth in the 50-meter freestyle with a time of 25.45 seconds, and won the B-final of the 200-meter freestyle with a 2:00.32.

2013

2013 National Championships
She competed at the 2013 US National Championships, where she finished third in the 100-meter freestyle and second in the 50-meter freestyle events.

2013 World Championships

She qualified for the 2013 World Aquatics Championships in Barcelona, and she won a gold medal in the preliminary for the 4x100-meter freestyle relay.

2013 Duel in the Pool
She also competed in the 2013 Duel in the Pool, where she won first in the 100-meter freestyle, third in the 50-meter freestyle, second in the 400-meter freestyle relay, and first in the 200-meter mixed medley relay.

2014
At the 2014 US National Championships, she finished first in the 50-meter freestyle, second in the 100-meter freestyle, and seventh in the 200-meter freestyle. She competed in that year's Pan Pacific Swimming Championships, where she won bronze in the 100-meter freestyle, silver in the 4x100-meter freestyle and 4x100 medley relays, and placed fourth in the 50-meter freestyle.

2015

In 2015, Manuel won her first two individual NCAA championships, winning the 50- and 100-yard freestyle, setting an NCAA, American, U.S. Open, Championship, and Pool record in 100-yard freestyle with a time of 46.09. She also placed second in the 200-yard freestyle event. She became one of the first three African American women to place in the top three spots in the 100-yard freestyle event in any Division I NCAA Swimming Championship. She competed in the 2015 World Aquatics Championships, placing fourth in the 4x100 medley relay, sixth in the 100-meter freestyle, and eighth in the 50-meter freestyle.

2016 Summer Olympics

Manuel swam in the 2016 United States Olympic Trials, placing second in the 50- and 100-meter freestyle and seventh in the 200-meter freestyle. Her position in the 50- and 100-meter events qualified her to compete at the 2016 Summer Olympics in Rio de Janeiro.

She won a silver medal as part of the 4×100-meter freestyle relay along with Abbey Weitzeil, Dana Vollmer, and Katie Ledecky. She tied with Penny Oleksiak of Canada for the gold medal in the 100 m freestyle, both setting an Olympic record of 52.70. Manuel is the first African-American woman to win a gold medal in an individual swimming event and is also said to be the first black woman to achieve this. She later won silver in the 50-meter freestyle event and gold in the 4x100-meter medley relay.

2017 World Championships

At the 2017 US Nationals, the qualification meet for the World Championships in Budapest, Manuel won the 50-meter freestyle with a time of 24.27 and touched second in the 100-meter freestyle with a time of 53.05.

On the first day of the World Championships, Manuel anchored the women's 4x100-meter freestyle relay to a gold medal alongside Mallory Comerford, Kelsi Worrell, and Ledecky. She split a very fast 52.14 to anchor the team to a new American record time of 3:31.72. Manuel picked up her second gold of the meet when she anchored the mixed 4x100-meter medley relay with a split of 52.17. Together with Matt Grevers, Lilly King, and Caeleb Dressel, the team broke the world record in a time of 3:38.56. Manuel's first individual event of the meet was the 100-meter freestyle, where Swedish swimmer Sarah Sjöström was widely considered the favorite to win since she had broken the world record while leading off the 4x100-meter freestyle relay on the first night of the World Championships. In similar fashion to the previous summer at the Olympics, Manuel upset the favorite by coming from behind to win the 100-meter freestyle with an American record time of 52.27, out touching Sjöström by just four-hundredths of a second. The day after, she won her fourth gold medal in the mixed 4x100-meter freestyle relay, where she split 52.18 on the anchoring leg. Alongside Comerford, Dressel, and Nathan Adrian, they set a world record of 3:19.60. On the last night of the meet, Manuel swam the finals of both the 50-meter freestyle and the women's 4x100-meter medley relay. Touching in a bronze-winning time of 23.97, she set the American record and became the first American woman to break the 24-second barrier in the 50-meter freestyle. Manuel then anchored the women's 4x100-meter medley relay to a winning time of 3:51.55. The team of Kathleen Baker, King, Worrell, and Manuel broke the 2012 world record of 3:52.05 set by Missy Franklin, Rebecca Soni, Dana Vollmer, and Allison Schmitt.

2019 World Championships

At the 2019 World Aquatics Championships in Gwangju, South Korea in July 2019, Manuel became the first female American swimmer to win both the 50-meter freestyle and 100-meter freestyle events at a single FINA long course World Aquatics Championships meet. Manuel won a total of seven medals, four gold and three silver medals, at the 2019 World Aquatics Championships. This was most won by any female in the sport of swimming at a single FINA World Aquatics Championships series meet conducted in long course meters. In the 50-meter freestyle, 100-meter freestyle, 4x100-meter medley relay, and 4x100-meter mixed freestyle relay she won gold. She won silver in the 4x100-meter freestyle relay, 4x200-meter freestyle relay, and 4x100-meter mixed medley relay.

Manuel's accomplishments were highlighted by USA Swimming and she was the recipient of the 2019 "Female Athlete of the Year" award at the 2019 Golden Goggles Awards.

2021

2020 US Olympic Trials
At the 2020 USA Swimming Olympic Trials, postponed to June 2021 due to the COVID-19 pandemic, Manuel competed in the 100-meter freestyle and the 50-meter freestyle. In the 100-meter freestyle, she ranked 9th in the semifinals and did not qualify for the final. She attributed her performance to overtraining syndrome. In the 50-meter freestyle, Manuel ranked first in the final with a time of 24.29, qualifying for the US Olympic swim team in the 50-meter freestyle at the 2020 Summer Olympics.

2020 Summer Olympics

The 2020 Summer Olympics in Tokyo, Japan were the second Olympic Games Manuel qualified to compete in. She was selected as one of three first time captains, Allison Schmitt was selected as the only second time captain, along with Ryan Murphy and Caeleb Dressel for the USA Olympic swim team.

While Manuel did not qualify to swim in the 4x100-meter freestyle relay at the 2020 US Olympic Trials, Team USA coach Greg Meehan decided to put her on the relay in the finals of the event at the 2020 Olympic Games in place of some of the relay-only swimmers who qualified at the US Olympic Trials and had already swum in the prelims. Manuel was entered as the anchor, fourth, swimmer for the relay. In the final, Manuel helped the relay finish in third place with a time of 3:32.81 and won her first medal of the 2020 Olympics, a bronze medal in the 4x100-meter freestyle relay.

On day seven of competition, Manuel swam a 24.65 in the prelims heats of the 50-meter freestyle and advanced to the semifinals ranked 11th overall. On day eight, in the semifinals of the 50-meter freestyle, Manuel finished with a time of 24.63, ranked 11th overall, and did not advance to the final of the event.

Career best times

NR – National Record
AM – Americas Record

World records

 with Eugene Godsoe, Kevin Cordes, and Claire Donahue
 with Ryan Lochte, Nathan Adrian, and Missy Franklin
 short course record with Courtney Bartholomew, Katie Meili, and Kelsi Worrell
 with Matt Grevers, Lilly King, and Caeleb Dressel
 with Caeleb Dressel, Nathan Adrian, and Mallory Comerford
 with Kathleen Baker, Lilly King, and Kelsi Worrell
 with Caeleb Dressel, Zach Apple, and Mallory Comerford

Awards and honors
 Forbes, 30 Under 30 in sports: 2022
 Honda Sports Award (Swimming & Diving): 2017–2018
 Honda Cup, Collegiate Woman Athlete of the Year (Swimming & Diving): 2017–2018
 Golden Goggle Award, Female Athlete of the Year: 2019
 SwimSwam Swammy Award, US Swimmer of the Year (female): 2019
 Golden Goggle Award, Female Race of the Year: 2016
 Golden Goggle Award, Relay Performance of the Year: 2017, 2019
 SwimSwam Top 100 (Women's): 2021 (#5)

Personal

Sponsorships
Manuel turned to full-time professional swimming in July 2018, forgoing her final collegiate season with Stanford. On July 24, 2018, she signed with TYR Sport, Inc., joining former Stanford teammates Katie Ledecky and Lia Neal. Another one of Manuel's sponsors during the 2020 Summer Olympics was automotive manufacturer Toyota.

See also 

 List of world records in swimming
 List of multiple Olympic gold medalists at a single Games
 List of Olympic medalists in swimming (women)
 List of Americas records in swimming
 List of people from Texas
 Diversity in swimming

References

External links

 
 
 
 
 

1996 births
Living people
American female freestyle swimmers
World Aquatics Championships medalists in swimming
World record holders in swimming
Swimmers at the 2016 Summer Olympics
Medalists at the 2016 Summer Olympics
Olympic silver medalists for the United States in swimming
Sportspeople from Texas
People from Sugar Land, Texas
Olympic gold medalists for the United States in swimming
African-American sportswomen
Stanford Cardinal women's swimmers
Swimmers at the 2020 Summer Olympics
Medalists at the 2020 Summer Olympics
Olympic bronze medalists for the United States in swimming
21st-century African-American sportspeople
21st-century African-American women